Mateus Alonso Honorio, simply known as Mateus (born 16 June 1983), is a Brazilian retired footballer. Mainly a central defender, he could also play as a right back or defensive midfielder. He was a very aggressive player

External links
TFF stats and profile

1983 births
Living people
Brazilian footballers
Association football defenders
Associação Atlética Francana players
Mirassol Futebol Clube players
Esporte Clube Juventude players
Rio Branco Esporte Clube players
Esporte Clube Santo André players
Esporte Clube Taubaté players
Clube de Regatas Brasil players
Associação Atlética Internacional (Limeira) players
Associação Portuguesa de Desportos players
Atlético Clube Goianiense players
FC Vaduz players
MKE Ankaragücü footballers
Süper Lig players
Steel Azin F.C. players
Brazilian expatriate footballers
Expatriate footballers in Liechtenstein
Expatriate footballers in Turkey
Expatriate footballers in Iran
Expatriate footballers in Switzerland
Brazilian expatriate sportspeople in Liechtenstein
Brazilian expatriate sportspeople in Switzerland
Brazilian expatriate sportspeople in Turkey
Brazilian expatriate sportspeople in Iran